Nitrogen monofluoride (fluoroimidogen) is a metastable species that has been observed in laser studies.  It is isoelectronic with O2.  Like boron monofluoride, it is an instance of the rare multiply-bonded fluorine atom. It is unstable with respect to its formal dimer, dinitrogen difluoride, as well as to its elements, nitrogen and fluorine. 

Nitrogen monofluoride is produced when radical species (H, O, N, CH3) abstract a fluorine atom from nitrogen difluoride (NF2).  Stoichiometrically, the reaction is extremely efficient, regenerating a radical for long-lasting chain propagation.  However, radical impurities in the end product also catalyze that product's decomposition.  Azide decomposition offers a less-efficient but more pure technique: fluorine azide (which can be formed in situ via reaction of atomic fluorine with hydrazoic acid) decomposes upon shock into NF and N2. 

Many NF-producing reactions give the product in an excited state with characteristic chemiluminescence.  They have thus been investigated for development as a chemical laser.

References

Nitrogen fluorides
Nitrogen compounds